Brian Chase (born February 12, 1978) is an American drummer and drone musician who plays in the New York rock band Yeah Yeah Yeahs. He was ranked at #50 in Gigwise's list of The Greatest Drummers of All Time. He plays drums with traditional grip.

Career
Chase met Karen O at Ohio's Oberlin College, and he joined the Yeah Yeah Yeahs in 2000 after the original drummer left the trio.

Starting at college, Chase played for the rock band The Seconds. Chase has been described by the New York Times as "a consummate music nerd, a conservatory-trained jazz drummer who still plays in the city’s experimental scene."

Outside of his rock work with the Yeah Yeah Yeahs, Chase has performed in a number of experimental duos with other musicians such as Stefan Tcherepnin and Seth Misterka, with whom he released a CD Duo on the Australian Heathen Skulls label in 2007. Other musicians he has played with include Jessica Pavone, Mary Halvorson, Yonatan Gat, Moppa Elliott, and groups Oakley Hall, Blarvuster, and klezmer-fusionists The Sway Machinery

In May 2010 the Chase/Misterka Duo performed at the Melbourne International Jazz Festival and then a month-long Australian tour. A second record The Shape of Sound was released to coincide.

In 2013, Chase released the album Drums & Drones. A follow-up, Drums & Drones II, was released in 2018 by Canadian label ICM. Chase's drone work has been inspired by his time working at La Monte Young and Marian Zazeela's Dream House, NYC.

Chase founded and operates Chaikin Records, a label named after his family's original name.

References

External links
Yeah Yeah Yeahs official website
Zildjian Artists official profile
 http://www.chasebrian.com/

                   

1978 births
Living people
Musicians from New York (state)
American rock drummers
Oberlin College alumni
Musicians from Brooklyn
Yeah Yeah Yeahs members
20th-century American drummers
American male drummers
21st-century American drummers